The 2016 Dr McKenna Cup, known for sponsorship reasons as the Bank of Ireland Dr McKenna Cup, was an inter-county and university Gaelic football competition in the province of Ulster.

Twelve teams take part – the nine Ulster county teams and three university' teams i.e. St Mary's University College, Belfast, Queen's University Belfast and Ulster University.

Tyrone won for the fifth year in a row.

Format

Group Stage

The teams are drawn into three groups of four teams. Each team plays the other teams in its group once, earning 2 points for a win and 1 for a draw.

Knock-out Stage

The three group winners, and the best runner-up progress to the semi-finals with the two winners progressing to the final.

Group stage

Group A

Group B

Group C

Knock-out Stage

Semi-finals

Final

References

McKenna Cup
Dr McKenna Cup seasons